The Nokia 3510 is a mobile phone for the GSM network, introduced by Nokia on 12 March 2002. The phone was the first Nokia phone to bring GPRS internet services to the mass market. It was also the first Nokia phone to ship with Beatnik's miniBAE engine, allowing for playback of polyphonic ringtones. 

GPRS is used for data transmission and mobile Internet WAP service. The Nokia 3510i model supports Java 2 ME that makes it possible for users to download and use Java applications, background images and polyphonic ringtones. The phone supports SMS and MMS messaging.

Variants 
An enhanced version, Nokia 3510i, was introduced some time later on 6 September 2002 and released in December 2002. It was one of the first phones with a color display. The phone has a Nokia Series 40 96 x 65 user interface. It was sold in Europe, Russia, Middle East and Africa, while the Nokia 3530 was sold in Asia-Pacific, which operate on GSM 900/1800, and features a more conventional keypad.

Another variant, the Nokia 3590, was released to the North American market in 2003. It operates on GSM-1900 and GSM-850 networks. The phone was at one time available through the former AT&T GoPhone prepaid mobile phone service. The Nokia 3560 was also released the same year, with a different keypad, and operating on TDMA and AMPS for roaming. IS-136. It was sold until early 2004, when TDMA accounts were no longer being activated. This was followed by the Nokia 3595, featuring a different keypad and instead operating on GSM-1900 and GSM-850 networks.

Yet another variant, the Nokia 3585, was released in 2002, sporting a 96x65 pixel grayscale display that operates on CDMA2000 1X network. There is an enhanced model, the Nokia 3585i.

Technical data 

UEM - Universal Energy Management

Accessories 

Data port:

Fbus and Mbus uses 3,3 volt levels.

References

External links 
 Nokia 3595 Phone 
 Nokia 3560 Phone 
 Nokia 3510i STAR WARS Edition in Mobile Phone Museum 

Mobile phones introduced in 2002
3510

fi:Nokia 3510